Arben Bajraktaraj (born 29 January 1973) is a Kosovan-born French actor. Bajraktaraj has starred in numerous French films but also in roles in international movies, such as Eden Log and Sex Traffic. He has frequently portrayed crime syndicate operatives in films like Taken and Verso. He is also well-known for his role as the Death Eater Antonin Dolohov in the Harry Potter films. He has worked throughout his career with numerous film directors such as Gérard Pirès, Xavier Ruiz, Tony Gatlif and Pierre Morel.

Early life 
Arben Bajraktaraj was born in Isniq on 29 January 1973. He completed primary school at Liria Primary School (now Isa Boletini Primary School) in Isniq. During his childhood and early adolescence, while herding cattle in the mountains of his homeland, he became interested in literature as inspired by Kângë Kreshnikësh from the natural beauties of the mountains. He finished high school in Maribor, Slovenia, where he received his first lessons in theater. He continued his education in Paris at Acting International, with Professor Robert Cordier.

Partial filmography 

Glowing Eyes (2002)
Sex Traffic (2004) – Thaki
Au bout du quai (2004) – Ibrahim
Sky Fighters (2005) – Fredericks
Harry Potter and the Order of the Phoenix (2007) – Antonin Dolohov (Death Eater)
Les bleus: premiers pas dans la police (1 episode, 2007) – Akim Tasko
Eden Log (2007) – Technician
Taken (2008) – Marko
Les Insoumis (2008) – Marinescu
Flics (1 episode, 2008) – Vlad
Korkoro (2009) – Darko
Verso (2009) – Besim
Of Gods and Men (2010) – Ouvrier croate 2
Sarah's Key (2010) – M. Starzynski
Harry Potter and the Deathly Hallows – Part 1 (2010) – Antonin Dolohov (Death Eater)
Polisse (2011) – Yougo échappé
Welcome to Hoxford: The Fan Film (2011, short) – Warden Gordon Barken
Le Jour de la grenouille (2011) – L'homme d'un soir
To Redemption (2012) – Valmir
Man on Asphalt (2012)
The Woman Who Brushed Off Her Tears (2012) – Lucien
Mains armées (2012) – Gustav Alana 'Coach'
Superstar (2012) – Associé Lolita Club
L'homme qui rit (2012) – Hardquanone
La Cité rose (2012) – Gitan
La mante religieuse (2012) – Stan
Joséphine (2013) – Le forain
The Hero (2014) – Hero
Call My Agent! (2015 TV series) – Gabor Rajevski
Missions (2017 TV series) – Soviet cosmonaut Vladimir Komarov
Nicky Larson et le parfum de Cupidon (2019)  — Black Gloves
Besa (TV series) (2020 TV series) - Dardan Berisha

References

External links 

Personal website

1973 births
Living people
People from Deçan
Kosovo Albanians
Kosovan male actors
Kosovan expatriates in France
French male film actors
20th-century French male actors
21st-century French male actors